Achena Atithi may refer to:

 Achena Atithi (1973 film), a 1973 Bengali film
 Achena Atithi (1997 film), a 1997 Bengali film